Lake Engozero is a large freshwater lake in the Republic of Karelia, Russia. It has an area of 122 km2 (without islands), length of 36.4 km, width of 7.9 km and a maximum depth of 18 m. There are 144 islands with total area of 14 km2 on the lake.

References

Engozero